William Watson Davis (February 12, 1884 - April 5, 1960) was a professor and author in the United States. He was part of the white supremacist Dunning School of Confederate sympathizing anti-Reconstruction Southern scholars during the Jim Crow era.

Davis was born in Pensacola, Florida to Mathew L. Davis and Annie Laurie Lane Davis.  He married Roxana Henderson in 1915 and they had one child, Edward Lane Davis.

Davis studied at Wright Military Academy in Mobile, Alabama; Alabama Polytechnic Institute;, and Columbia University (Ph.D. 1913.). He was a professor of history at the University of Kansas from 1912 until 1954. 

His book on Reconstruction era Florida, based on his Phd thesis was reissued as part of a series celebrating Florida's quadracenntennial featuring the governor and cabinet on the opening pages. Other books in the series included Carpetbag Rule in Florida, putatively by John Wallace. Fletcher M. Green wrote a lengthy introduction to the quadracentenbial edition covering Watson's life, publishings, and criticisms of the Dunning School.

Bibliography
Ante-Bellum Southern Commercial Conventions, Montgomery, Alabama, 1905
The Civil War and Reconstruction in Florida. Columbia University Press, New York, 1913

References

External links
Findagrave entry

1884 births
1960 deaths
People from Pensacola, Florida
Auburn University alumni
Columbia University alumni
University of Kansas faculty
American writers
Dunning School